Afrasiab Museum of Samarkand (Uzbek: Afrosiyob-Samarqand shahar tarixi muzeyi) is a museum located at the historical site of Afrasiyab, one of the largest archaeological sites in the world and the ancient city that was destroyed by the Mongols in the early 13th century. Museum building and the archaeological site are located in the north-eastern part of the city of Samarkand in the Central Asian country of Uzbekistan. It bears the name of Afrasiab, mythical king and hero of Turan. Permanent exhibition of the Afrasiab Museum of Samarkand is focused on the history of the city itself as well as the surrounding region. The museum building was designed by Armenian architect Bagdasar Arzumanyan in 1970, at the time when Uzbek Soviet Socialist Republic was still part of the Soviet Union. The opening of the museum was dedicated to the 2500th anniversary of the founding of the city of Samarkand. Thematically, the museum is divided into five rooms dedicated to different periods of life in the fort of Afrasiyab.

The museum was conceived as the place that will share the story about the founding of the city of Samarkand, its subsequent history, as well as the settlement of Afrasiyab. The museum features a variety of exhibits, including not only artifacts found during excavations in Afrasiyab and Samarkand but its wider region as well. Among the artifacts one can find the remains of ancient swords, ossuaries, knives and other sharp objects, arrows, coins, ceramics, ancient manuscripts and books, statues and other ancient objects of everyday life. Museum exposition consists of more than 22 000 unique exhibits. One notable exhibit are the uniquely preserved Afrasiab murals of Samarkand palace belonging to the period of Ikhshid Dynasty from the 7th-8th centuries. 

In December 2015, as a part of cultural cooperation between Uzbekistan and Azerbaijan, Azerbaijani pavilion was opened at the Afrasiab Museum. Azerbaijani Pavilion exhibits objects that present history and culture of Azerbaijan, samples of material culture, national dress, including hats and kalaghai, books about the culture and the Azerbaijani carpet weaving traditions.

Artifacts

References

Buildings and structures in Samarkand
Museums in Uzbekistan